Hoàng Xuân Lãm (10 October 1928, Huế–2 May 2017, Davis, California) was a general in the Army of the Republic of Vietnam (ARVN).

In late 1965, while Lãm was serving as commander of the 2nd Division, COMUSMACV General William Westmoreland and his chief of staff of operations, General William E. DePuy, blamed the division's temerity on its "less aggressive" commander, who had been either unwilling or unable to get the division moving during the year.

He was given responsibility for the I Corps Tactical Zone in 1967. During the Battle of Khe Sanh the 1,500 civilians, 400 of which were ethnic Bru, of the area were looking for refuge. Lãm authorized the evacuation of the 1,100 Vietnamese, but the Bru were told to stay, Hoang Xuan Lam insisting that, 'there was no place for minority refugees.

Lãm coordinated the Operation Lam Son 719 which aimed at striking the Ho Chi Minh Trail in southeastern Laos during 1971.

Due to his political connections with President Nguyễn Văn Thiệu, he was still serving as I Corps commander when the North Vietnamese launched the Easter Offensive in 1972. Lãm was recalled to Saigon on 2 May 1972 by Thiệu, who relieved him of his command, due to complaints regarding Lãm's fitness and competency as a general. Lãm was named to head an anti-corruption campaign at the Ministry of Defense. 

Lãm's replacement as I Corps commander, Lieutenant General Ngô Quang Trưởng, said “I had served in I Corps under General Lãm and the disaster that occurred there was no surprise to me. Neither General Lãm nor his staff were competent to maneuver and support large forces in heavy combat.”

References 

1928 births
2017 deaths
People from Huế
Army of the Republic of Vietnam generals